Jevgenij Shuklin (born 23 November 1985 in Glazov, Russia) is a Russian-born Lithuanian sprint canoeist who has competed since 2003.  He was world junior champion in 2003 (Japan, Komatsu).  He won a silver medal at the 2012 Summer Olympics.  He won four bronze medals in the C-1 200 m event at the ICF Canoe Sprint World Championships, earning them in 2006, 2007, 2009 and 2014. He is also a three time European champion, in Pontevedra in 2007, in Trasona in 2010 and in Montemor-o-Velho in 2013. On 12 June 2019, the IOC stripped Jevgenij Shuklin of his silver medal at the 2012 Summer Olympics.

References

Canoe09.ca profile 

1985 births
Lithuanian male canoeists
Lithuanian sportspeople in doping cases
Lithuanian people of Russian descent
Doping cases in canoeing
Living people
People from Visaginas
Canoeists at the 2012 Summer Olympics
Olympic canoeists of Lithuania
ICF Canoe Sprint World Championships medalists in Canadian
Lithuanian Sportsperson of the Year winners
Competitors stripped of Summer Olympics medals
Universiade medalists in canoeing
Universiade gold medalists for Lithuania
Medalists at the 2013 Summer Universiade